Mohamed "Meddy" Mushimiyimana (born 28 January 1996) is a Rwandan footballer who currently plays for APR in the Rwanda Premier League and the Rwanda national team as a midfielder.

Career 
Mushimiyimana started his career in a local club called AS Kigali, and after denying other local clubs, in 2015 he signed for Győri ETO .

International career 
Mushimiyimana made his senior international debut for Rwanda as a substitute in a second leg 2014 African Nations Championship qualification match defeat by penalties against Ethiopia on 27 July 2013.

Honours 

AS Kigali
 Rwandan Cup: Winner (2013)
 Rwanda National Football League: Third place (2013–14)
 CAF Confederation Cup: Second Round (2014)

Rwanda
 2013 CECAFA Cup: Quarter-finals

References 

1996 births
Living people
Rwandan footballers
Rwanda international footballers
People from Kigali
Association football midfielders
AS Kigali FC players